Catherine L. Kling (born 1960) is an American economist, currently a Tisch University Professor in the Dyson School of Applied Economics and Management and Faculty Director at the Atkinson Center for a Sustainable Future at Cornell University. In 2015, Kling was elected to the United States National Academy of Sciences. Kling has conducted research in the areas of environmental policy design and the valuation of environmental goods.

Until July 2018, Kling was the Charles F. Curtiss Distinguished Professor in Agriculture and Life Sciences at Iowa State University.

References

1960 births
Living people
University of Iowa alumni
University System of Maryland alumni
Iowa State University faculty
21st-century American economists
Members of the United States National Academy of Sciences